Głos may refer to:
 Głos (1886–1905), a social, literary and political weekly review published in Warsaw
 Głos (1991), a socio-political weekly magazine headed by Antoni Macierewicz
 Głos (Czech Republic) (formerly Głos Ludu), a daily newspaper of the Polish minority in the Czech Republic
 Głos – Tygodnik Nowohucki, a weekly magazine founded in 1957, published in Kraków